Xeroderma pigmentosum, complementation group C, also known as XPC, is a protein which in humans is encoded by the XPC gene. XPC is involved in the recognition of bulky DNA adducts in nucleotide excision repair. It is located on chromosome 3.

Function 

This gene encodes a component of the nucleotide excision repair (NER) pathway. There are multiple components involved in the NER pathway, including Xeroderma pigmentosum (XP) A-G and V, Cockayne syndrome (CS) A and B, and trichothiodystrophy (TTD) group A, etc. This component, XPC, plays an important role in the early steps of global genome NER, especially in damage recognition, open complex formation, and repair protein complex formation.

The complex of XPC-RAD23B is the initial damage recognition factor in global genomic nucleotide excision repair (GG-NER).  XPC-RAD23B recognizes a wide variety of lesions that thermodynamically destabilize DNA duplexes, including UV-induced photoproducts (cyclopyrimidine dimers and 6-4 photoproducts ), adducts formed by environmental mutagens such as benzo[a]pyrene or various aromatic amines, certain oxidative endogenous lesions such as cyclopurines and adducts formed by cancer chemotherapeutic drugs such as cisplatin. The presence of XPC-RAD23B is required for assembly of the other core NER factors and progression through the NER pathway both in vitro and in vivo. Although most studies have been performed with XPC-RAD23B, it is part of a trimeric complex with centrin-2, a calcium-binding protein of the calmodulin family.

Clinical significance 

Mutations in this gene or some other NER components result in Xeroderma pigmentosum, a rare autosomal recessive disorder characterized by increased sensitivity to sunlight with the development of carcinomas at an early age.

Cancer
DNA damage appears to be the primary underlying cause of cancer, and deficiencies in DNA repair genes likely underlie many forms of cancer.  If DNA repair is deficient, DNA damage tends to accumulate. Such excess DNA damage may increase mutations due to error-prone translesion synthesis. Excess DNA damage may also increase epigenetic alterations due to errors during DNA repair. Such mutations and epigenetic alterations may give rise to cancer.

Reductions in expression of DNA repair genes (usually caused by epigenetic alterations such as promoter hypermethylation) are very common in cancers, and are ordinarily much more frequent than mutational defects in DNA repair genes in cancers.  The table below shows that XPC expression was frequently epigenetically reduced in bladder cancer and also in non-small cell lung cancer, and also shows that XPC was more frequently reduced in the more advanced stages of these cancers.

While epigenetic hypermethylation of the promoter region of the XPC gene was shown to be associated with low expression of XPC, another mode of epigenetic repression of XPC may also occur by over-expression of the microRNA miR-890.

Interactions 

XPC (gene) has been shown to interact with ABCA1, CETN2 and XPB.

References

Further reading

External links 
  GeneReviews/NIH/NCBI/UW entry on Xeroderma Pigmentosum